Parambia cedroalis is a moth in the family Crambidae. It is found in Cuba.

References

Moths described in 1924
Glaphyriinae